Metrogon is a high resolution, low-distortion, extra-wide field (90 degree field of view) photographic lens design, popularized by Bausch and Lomb. Variations of this design are said to have been used extensively by the US military for use in aerial photography on the T-11 camera.

The most common Metrogon lenses have a f number of 6.3 and a focal length of 6 inches. The company name Bausch and Lomb and the US Patent number 2031792 are prominently inscribed on the front of the lens barrel. However, the said US Patent is of a 4 element lens that belongs to one inventor named Robert Richter of Carl Zeiss AG, filed in 1934. For this reason, it is said that the Metrogon is a US version of the popular and very similar (if not identical) Topogon design by Carl Zeiss.

In 1943, Bausch and Lomb themselves filed a patent for a similar, f/6.3 lens design but with 5 elements, under the US patent number 2325275, showing less distortion than the lens in the Carl Zeiss patent. It is not certain whether Bausch and Lomb incorporated their own design instead of the Zeiss design when producing lenses under the Metrogon name later on. The Bausch and Lomb patent also compares the distortion of their design favorably to another 5 element lens (US patent number 2116264) which has a slightly wider maximum f-number of f/5.6.

References

External links 
The Metrogon Page

Photographic lenses